Turtles was a South Korean hip-hop group which debuted in 2001.  The single "Airplane" (bihaengi) from their fourth album topped the KBS chart in September 2006.

The lead singer and rapper of the group, "Turtleman" (born Lim Sung-hoon), died of a heart attack on April 2, 2008; he was found by his manager at his apartment.

On September 4, 2008, the remaining members (Geum Bi and Z-E) announced the official disbandment. On April 18, 2011, they announced they would be returning on April 28, with a new male vocalist and single.

Members 
 Turtleman (터틀맨, rap and vocals, 2001–2008)
 Z-E (지이, rap and vocals) (2001–present)
 Geum Bi (금비, vocals) (2001–present)
 Su Bin (수빈, vocals, 2001) 
 Lee Kang (이강, rap and vocals, 2011)

Discography

Albums 
 Go! Boogie!, 2001
 Turtles 2, 2003
 Turtles 3, 2004
 Buy Turtles, 2006
 오방간다 (OhBangGanDa), 2008
 아이고 (Aigoo), 2011
 주인공 (protagonist), 2011

Mini albums 
 Turtles: Digital Single – Christmas Mix, 2006
 Turtles: 4.5 – Remake Single, 2007
 Turtles: Digital Single – 분홍빛 크리스마스, 2007

Compilations 
 Turtles Best, The Land of Turtles, 2006
 Turtles Special Album, The Unfinished Story, August 14, 2008, in memory of Lim Sung-hoon

Awards

Mnet Asian Music Awards

References

External links 
 Turtle in empas people

Musical groups established in 2001
Musical groups disestablished in 2008
South Korean hip hop groups
South Korean dance music groups
South Korean co-ed groups